Harry Potter and the Deathly Hallows – Part 2 could refer to:

 Harry Potter and the Deathly Hallows – Part 2
 Harry Potter and the Deathly Hallows – Part 2 (video game)
 Harry Potter and the Deathly Hallows – Part 2 (soundtrack)